Cribrinopsis is a genus of cnidarians belonging to the family Actiniidae.

The species of this genus are found in Eurasia, Northern America and New Zealand.

Species:

Cribrinopsis albopunctata 
Cribrinopsis crassa 
Cribrinopsis fernaldi 
Cribrinopsis japonica 
Cribrinopsis olegi 
Cribrinopsis robertii 
Cribrinopsis rubens 
Cribrinopsis similis 
Cribrinopsis williamsi 
Cribrionopsis asiatica

References

Actiniidae
Hexacorallia genera